The following is a list of recurring Saturday Night Live characters and sketches introduced between October 2, 2004, and May 21, 2005, the thirtieth season of SNL.

Bear City
This series of very short films by longtime SNL writer T. Sean Shannon was about a town abandoned by humans after a meteor strike but then quickly repopulated by bears, who had rapidly evolved due to some strange chemical property of the meteor. City life continued as normal, only with bears in the place of humans. The introduction to each film, explaining the origins of Bear City, used a pre-recorded narration by Fred Willard.

Appearances

A short about a bear working in a video rental store was cut from episodes that aired November 13, 2004, and April 16, 2005. A short where a teenage boy bear's friends embarrass him in front of a girl bear was cut from the November 20, 2004, episode. A short about a bear putting up Christmas lights was cut from the December 11, 2004, episode. A short about a bear hailing a taxi cab was cut from episodes that aired March 19, 2005, and May 7, 2005. A short about a group of bears chasing the Easter Bunny was cut from the March 19, 2005, episode. A short about a bear going shopping was cut from the April 9, 2005, episode. A short about bears riding in an elevator was cut from the May 14, 2005, episode.

Carol!
Horatio Sanz plays a loud, gluttonous, vulgar, and generally obnoxious woman. Following the character's first appearance in a sketch about a key party, each successive sketch features Carol winning the attentions of a handsome and cultured gentleman played by that week's host. The sketch ends with Carol and the gentleman adjourning to some very unsavory location (such as a port-o-let or dumpster) to have sex.

In each installment of the sketch, except the first ("Key Party"), Carol attempts to order a fast-food chain's signature beverage while not at that chain, (for example, in one sketch she attempts to order a "Shamrock Shake" when she's not at a McDonald's nor is it near St. Patrick's Day).  Being informed the establishment can't provide that beverage, she orders an obscure high-alcohol cocktail instead, which the establishment is able to provide.

Theme song: "And then there's Carol! And then there's Carol! Sassy, slutty, sexy, skanky, right on Carol!"

Appearances

Phoebe and her Giant Pets
Phoebe (Rachel Dratch) invites her date (played by that week's host) to her apartment, where he's tormented by her gigantic anthropomorphic pet (Fred Armisen).

Appearances

A sketch in which Phoebe and her parrot, Jasper, invite her date and his giant pigeon (played by Maya Rudolph) over for lunch appeared in the dress rehearsals for the April 16, 2005, episode hosted by Tom Brady, and the May 7, 2005, episode hosted by Johnny Knoxville, but was cut before the final show both times.

Nuni and Nuni Schoener, Art Dealers
Fred Armisen and Maya Rudolph play a pair of married European art dealers whose bizarre interior decorating schemes (such as a chair made entirely out of toast) result in bewilderment for their American guest. Each sketch featured massive confusion over the very subtle difference in pronunciation of their identical-sounding names (in one sketch, the female "Nuni" explains that while pronouncing her name, and not while pronouncing her husband's, "you have to squeeze your buttocks") and the Schoeners' inability to pronounce simple American names such as Pam or Jeff.

A sketch featuring the Schoeners appeared in the dress rehearsal for the December 9, 2006, episode hosted by Annette Bening, but was cut from the final show.

The Lundford Twins Feel Good Variety Hour
This sketch featured regular cast member Fred Armisen as Henry Quincy Lundford, along with that week's SNL host, as the hosts of a 70s-era, Smothers Brothers-esque variety show. It featured Amy Poehler as Dorothy Winckler, an actress who herself was playing a character named Granny, whose catchphrase was "Aw, nuts!", accompanied by a zoom to her face; Maya Rudolph as a female-empowerment singer who sang about being pregnant and not needing a man; Kenan Thompson as a Barry White-esque, "King of the Sob Songs" singer, whose song was "Amanda"; and a skit set to 1920s-style upright piano music that featured two flappers, Charlie Chaplin, and a man cranking an old Model-T Ford.

Appearances

An installment of this sketch appeared in the dress rehearsal for the May 14, 2005, episode, hosted by Will Ferrell, but was cut before the final show.

Gays in Space
Synopsis
A TV show about a fabulous gay spaceship crew: Thad (Chris Parnell), Billiam (Fred Armisen), and Kevindy (Kenan Thompson), led by their fearless captain (portrayed by that week's host). They occasionally meet up with another ship captained by the butch Loretta (Rachel Dratch) and crewed by Tina Fey and Paula Pell.

In the sketch's first two appearances, Maya Rudolph introduces the show and sings the closing theme song, while dressed in a silver go-go outfit; in the third appearance, this is done by Will Forte in a silver two-piece suit and turtleneck, as Rudolph was on maternity leave at the time. Gays in Space is originally shown to be a program on the Trio network; while later, the broadcasting network is shown to be Logo.

Reception
In 2008, Logo's entertainment website AfterElton.com (now known as TheBacklot.com) criticized Gays in Space, among other SNL sketches, for consistently perpetuating stereotypical characterizations of the LGBT community, describing the portrayal as "a limp-wristed gay space crew, wearing silver uniforms and short-shorts, mak[ing] lewd sexual references and catty comments while sipping cocktails."

References

Lists of recurring Saturday Night Live characters and sketches
Saturday Night Live in the 2000s
Saturday Night Live
Saturday Night Live